Hjelset is a village in Molde Municipality in Møre og Romsdal county, Norway. The European route E39 highway runs through the village on its way northeast from the town of Molde to the village of Batnfjordsøra in Gjemnes Municipality.

References

Molde
Villages in Møre og Romsdal